The 1956 Polish Speedway season was the 1956 season of motorcycle speedway in Poland.

Individual

Polish Individual Speedway Championship
The 1956 Individual Speedway Polish Championship was held over three legs.

Rzeszów, 5 August
Leszno, 19 August
Bydgoszcz, 4 November

Team

Team Speedway Polish Championship
The 1956 Team Speedway Polish Championship was the ninth edition of the Team Polish Championship.

First League 
In First League, matches were played with part two teams, with it playing it matches return. Teams were made up of six drivers plus one reserve. The score of heat: 3-2-1-0. Mecz consisted with 12 heats. For winning a game a team received 2 points, draw - 1 point, lost - 0 points. The drivers from main squad started in match four times. The quantity of small points was added up.

The 2 competing teams shall each consist of 7 drivers: 6 drivers having programmed drivers and the seventh driver being a substitute, as follows:
Home Team (Helmet colour Red and Blue): No 9, 10, 11, 12, 13, 14 and 15,
Away Team (Yellow and White): No 1, 2, 3, 4, 5, 6, and 7.

Table

Medalists

Second League 
In Second League, matches were played with part two teams, with it playing it matches return. Teams were made up of six riders plus two reserve. The scoring of a heat: 3-2-1-0. Mecz consisted with 9 heats. For winning a  game a team received 2 points, draw - 1 point, loss - 0 points. The riders from the main squad started in the match three times. The quantity of small points was added up.

North Group

South Group

Play-Offs
Match was played in Ostrów Wlkp.

References

Poland Individual
Poland Team
Speedway